Konstantīns is a Latvian masculine given name. Individuals bearing the name Konstantīns include:
Konstantīns Calko (born 1994), racing driver 
Konstantīns Igošins (born 1971), footballer
Konstantīns Konstantinovs (born 1978), powerlifter
Konstantīns Ovčiņņikovs (born 1983), Russian-Latvian judoka
Konstantīns Pēkšēns (1859—1928), architect
Konstantīns Raudive (1909—1974), writer and intellectual

References

Latvian masculine given names